Ototyphlonemertes is a genus of worms belonging to the family Ototyphlonemertidae. The distribution of members of this genus includes Eurasia.

Species 
Ototyphlonemertes includes the following species:

 Ototyphlonemertes americana 
 Ototyphlonemertes ani 
 Ototyphlonemertes antipai 
 Ototyphlonemertes aurantiaca 
 Ototyphlonemertes aurita 
 Ototyphlonemertes brevis 
 Ototyphlonemertes brunnea 
 Ototyphlonemertes chernyshevi 
 Ototyphlonemertes cirrula 
 Ototyphlonemertes claparedii 
 Ototyphlonemertes correae 
 Ototyphlonemertes dolichobasis 
 Ototyphlonemertes duplex 
 Ototyphlonemertes envalli 
 Ototyphlonemertes erneba 
 Ototyphlonemertes esulcata 
 Ototyphlonemertes evelinae 
 Ototyphlonemertes lactea 
 Ototyphlonemertes lei 
 Ototyphlonemertes longissima 
 Ototyphlonemertes macintoshi 
 Ototyphlonemertes martynovi 
 Ototyphlonemertes nakaoae 
 Ototyphlonemertes nikolaii 
 Ototyphlonemertes norenburgi 
 Ototyphlonemertes pallida 
 Ototyphlonemertes parmula 
 Ototyphlonemertes pellucida 
 Ototyphlonemertes santacruzensis 
 Ototyphlonemertes spiralis 
 Ototyphlonemertes tsukagoshii 
 Ototyphlonemertes valentinae 
 Ototyphlonemertes victoriae

References 

Nemerteans